James Mason is an Australian television and film actor and producer. He started his career participating in a series of short films and commercials. He then secured the role of Chris Pappas on the Australian soap opera Neighbours. Chris was the show's first ever gay male regular character and won Mason wide recognition, including a Logie nomination for Most Popular New Talent in 2012.

He left Neighbours in 2015 to pursue other projects. He began to appear in more short films, web series and later secured roles in the films 36 Questions, William Kelly's War  and Slaughterhouse. In 2018 the actor joined the cast of Network Ten drama series Playing for Keeps, playing Jack Davies, a gay Australian Football League (AFL) player whose death forms the main narrative of the show's first season.

Early life
Mason studied a Theatre Studies VCE at Monbulk College from 2006 until 2007. Mason had always enjoyed acting during High School but only decided to pursue it as a career during his final school years. His father Adrian Mason and mother Aylee Sunstrom were supportive of his career aspirations. He is bilingual and can speak both English and Swedish.

Career
Mason began his career starring in a number of independent short films and television commercials during 2008 and 2009. The actor rose to prominence playing the role Chris Pappas on the Australian television soap opera Neighbours. Mason's agent secured him an audition for the role of Andrew Robinson. Actor Jordan Smith won the role of Andrew, but three days later Mason was offered the chance to play Chris. Chris is the show's first gay ongoing character. Neighbours then executive producer Susan Bower created the character following requests from viewers in the Neighbours website discussion forums. Two-thirds of actors quit the audition process for Chris when they discovered the character was gay. Mason began filming for Neighbours in October 2009 and the character arrived on-screen during February 2010. Mason said that he was "really excited" to play the role and added the writers had helped him to accurately portray a gay male. Chris was initially a guest character but Mason was later promoted to the show's regular cast. For his portrayal of Chris, Mason was nominated for Most Popular New Male Talent at the Logie Awards of 2012. The actor filmed for an unaired television pilot titled SPIN in 2013. In 2015, Mason decided to leave Neighbours after five years in the role.

Mason secured a lead role in the 2018 film 36 Questions. The film focuses on a couple who go on a date under unusual circumstances. The actor's involvement with the film began in 2014, when he was still starring in Neighbours. The movie was supposed to be released that year but only made it to post-production in 2017. In 2015, Mason secured a guest role in Ben Nicholas' web series titled Footballer Wants a Wife. In 2016, he presented a travel documentary titled Budget Backpacker: Iceland. He travelled to Iceland and profiled his journey visiting tourist destinations for the video, which was released online. In 2017, he filmed a guest role in a DCF Studio television production titled Bernie Brown.

Mason took more acting work during 2018. He had the lead role as Jacob in the comedy web series titled Freudian Slip, which premiered in March. Then in May it was announced that he had secured the role of Jack Davies in the Network Ten drama series Playing for Keeps. The show is about a group of AFL players and their wives' personal lives. Jack is another gay character Mason has played and the series also centres around the scandal of his death.

In October 2018, it was announced that Mason had secured a role in the 2019 series Ms Fisher's MODern Murder Mysteries. He has also filmed another lead role in the independent film The Slaughterhouse Killer as Nathan. On 7 May 2022, it was reported that Mason will reprise his Neighbours role for the show's final episodes. Mason will appear in the upcoming film titled "Residence''.

Filmography

Sources:

Awards and nominations

References

External links
 

Living people
21st-century Australian male actors
Australian male television actors
Year of birth missing (living people)